The Tyronza Water Tower is a historic elevated steel water tower located in Tyronza, Arkansas. It was built in 1935 by the Chicago Bridge & Iron Company in conjunction with the Public Works Administration as part of a project to improve the local water supply. It was added to the National Register of Historic Places in 2007, as part of a multiple-property listing that included numerous other New Deal-era projects throughout Arkansas. The Tyronza Water Tower is considered an excellent representation of 1930s-era waterworks construction.

In 2003, a new, 200,000-gallon steel water tower was built next to the 1935 tower, in conjunction with other water system improvements in the area. The old tower is still in use, however.

See also
Cotter Water Tower
Hampton Waterworks
Mineral Springs Waterworks
Monette Water Tower
National Register of Historic Places listings in Poinsett County, Arkansas
Waldo Water Tower (Waldo, Arkansas)

References

External links
An Ambition to be Preferred: New Deal Recovery Efforts and Architecture in Arkansas, 1933-1943, By Holly Hope

Infrastructure completed in 1935
Towers completed in 1935
Buildings and structures in Poinsett County, Arkansas
Water towers on the National Register of Historic Places in Arkansas
Public Works Administration in Arkansas
National Register of Historic Places in Poinsett County, Arkansas